Klaus Ludwiczak (born 21 October 1951) is a German field hockey player. He competed in the men's tournament at the 1976 Summer Olympics.

References

External links
 

1951 births
Living people
German male field hockey players
Olympic field hockey players of West Germany
Field hockey players at the 1976 Summer Olympics
Sportspeople from Cologne
20th-century German people